Sinnamp'o station is a freight-only railway station in Hanggu-guyŏk, Namp'o Special City, North Korea, on the P'yŏngnam Line of the Korean State Railway; it is also the starting point of the Namp'ohang Line.

The station was opened by the Korean State Railway after the end of the Korean War, at the same time as the Nampo'hang Line, to serve glass factories and shipbuilders located in the area. This station also serves the Ch'ŏnji Lubricant Factory and the Pyonghwa Motors factory.

References

Railway stations in North Korea